The 2023 Aurora mayoral election will be held on November 7, 2023 to elect the mayor of Aurora, Colorado. Incumbent Republican mayor Mike Coffman is running for re-election to a second term in office.

Candidates

Declared
Mike Coffman, incumbent mayor (Party affiliation: Republican)
Juan Marcano, city councilor (Party affiliation: Democratic)

References

External links 
Official campaign websites
 Juan Marcano (D) for Mayor

2023
2023 Colorado elections
2023 United States mayoral elections